North Surrey Secondary is a public high school in Surrey, British Columbia and is part of School District 36 Surrey.  The current structure dates from 1993, but the site has been in use since 1949. During the 1999–2000 year, a track was constructed on property north of the main building.  The school is notable for its drama and art departments, both of which have been the recipient of several awards. Several movies have been filmed at the school including Agent Cody Banks.

Alumni

John Tenta – Professional Wrestler
Brad Lazarowich – NHL Linesman
Colin Fraser – Professional Hockey Player
Laurent Brossoit – Hockey Player
Devin Townsend – Musician
Connor Lui - Professional VALORANT Player

High schools in Surrey, British Columbia
Educational institutions established in 1949
1949 establishments in British Columbia